Draw Down the Moon is the fourth studio album by American rock band, Foxing. The album was released on August 6, 2021 through Hopeless Records.

Background 
The American indie rock band Foxing released their third studio album, Nearer My God, on August 10, 2018, through Triple Crown Records. The album release was accompanied by two tours: one coheadlining with Pianos Become the Teeth in the UK and Ireland from August 9 to August 16, and another in North America from August 26 to September 30. After another coheadlining tour, this time with Now, Now in April and May 2019, Foxing closed out the year on tour with Oso Oso in support of Manchester Orchestra on the latter's 10-year anniversary tour for Mean Everything to Nothing (2009).

Coming three years after Dealer, both the diverse instrumentation and the emotionally-charged lyrics of Nearer My God were seen by music critics as more experimental than Foxing's first two albums. Frontman Conor Murphy admitted later that the band had purposely pushed themselves to "bite off more than [they] can chew" while writing Nearer My God, and wrote music that was intentionally technically challenging for each instrumentalist.

Recording and production 
The disruptions caused by the COVID-19 pandemic caused multiple difficulties for Foxing. They had planned to "road test" a handful of songs on Draw Down the Moon during a May 2020 tour with Bent Knee before the virus brought touring to a halt, and to make up for the lost income usually provided by touring, Murphy and guitarist Eric Hudson both began offering music lessons over Skype. Guitarist Ricky Sampson, meanwhile, left the band in October 2020, citing a desire for stability that the music industry could not provide.

Reception 

Draw Down the Moon was met with mostly positive reviews from music critics. At Metacritic, which assigns a normalized rating out of 100 to reviews from mainstream critics, Draw Down the Moon has an average score of 80 based on nine reviews. The review aggregator AnyDecentMusic? gave the album 7.7 out of 10, based on their assessment of the critical consensus.

Track listing

References

External links 
 

Foxing (band) albums
Hopeless Records albums
2021 albums
Albums produced by John Congleton